Charlotte Béquignon-Lagarde ( October 8, 1900, Lille - April 2, 1993, Veyrier-du-Lac) was the first woman law graduate of Caen University who was awarded an LL.D. 

Béquignon-Lagarde was the only woman on the French Court of Cassation. She was also a member of the Conflict Tribunal from 1959, and vice-president of that court until 1965.

References

20th-century French women lawyers
20th-century French lawyers
Lawyers from Lille
1900 births
1993 deaths